Hugo Armando and Xavier Malisse were the defending champions, but lost in the first round to Bob Bryan and Mike Bryan.

Max Mirnyi and Jamie Murray won in the final 6–4, 3–6, [10–6], against Bob Bryan and Mike Bryan.

Seeds

Draw

Draw

External links
Draw

Doubles